This is a list of members of the Australian Senate from 1975 to 1978. The 13 December 1975 election was a double dissolution of both houses, with all 127 seats in the House of Representatives, and all 64 seats in the Senate up for election. Malcolm Fraser had been commissioned as prime minister following the dismissal of Gough Whitlam's Labor government by Governor-General Sir John Kerr, on 11 November 1975. The same day, Fraser advised the calling of the election, in accordance with Kerr's stipulated conditions. Thus the Liberal Party of Australia, led by Fraser, with Coalition partner the National Country Party, led by Doug Anthony, went to the election as a caretaker government. The election resulted in the Coalition securing government with a 30-seat swing away from Labor in the House of Representatives.

In accordance with section 13 of the Constitution, following a double dissolution of Parliament, the terms for state senators commence on 1 July preceding the election, i.e., on 1 July 1975. The first five senators elected in each State were allocated full six-year terms ending on 30 June 1981 while the other half were allocated three-year terms ending on 30 June 1978.

There were two significant changes that affected the composition of the Senate.
The Northern Territory and Australian Capital Territory were to be represented in the Senate for the first time. The terms of senators representing the territories commenced on the date of the election and ended at the dissolution of the House of Representatives, in this case the December 1977 election.
A person appointed to a casual vacancy must be from the same political party as the original senator and is appointed until the end of the original term.

Austin Lewis had been appointed under the former system, however his term was extended to the end of the original term of 30 June 1981 as a result of the 1977 referendum. The first vacancy occurring under the new process was caused by the resignation of Steele Hall, who had been a member of the Liberal Movement but had joined the Liberal party in 1976 on the break-up of the Liberal Movement.

Notes

References

Members of Australian parliaments by term
20th-century Australian politicians
Australian Senate lists